Marten Klasema (12 May 1912 – 1 November 1974) was a Dutch athlete. He competed in the men's long jump and the men's triple jump at the 1936 Summer Olympics.

References

1912 births
1974 deaths
Athletes (track and field) at the 1936 Summer Olympics
Dutch male long jumpers
Dutch male triple jumpers
Olympic athletes of the Netherlands
Place of birth missing
20th-century Dutch people